Afghanistan withdrawal may refer to:

 Soviet withdrawal from Afghanistan
 Withdrawal of United States troops from Afghanistan
Withdrawal of United States troops from Afghanistan (2011–2016)
Withdrawal of United States troops from Afghanistan (2020–2021)

For earlier invasions and withdrawals from Afghanistan, see Invasions of Afghanistan